Highland Park, Arizona may refer to:

Highland Park, Cochise County, Arizona
Highland Park, Yavapai County, Arizona